The Hartford Whalers were an ice hockey team who played in both the National Hockey League (NHL) and the World Hockey Association (WHA). This is a list of the head coaches they had during their existence. The franchise moved to Raleigh, North Carolina in 1997 and became the Carolina Hurricanes

Key

WHA coaches

NHL coaches

See also
List of NHL head coaches
List of Carolina Hurricanes head coaches

 
Hartford Whalers head coaches
Head coaches